The Aley Synagogue also known as the Ohel Jacob Synagogue, is a synagogue built in Aley (Aley district, Lebanon) in 1895.

References 

Edot HaMizrach
Jewish Lebanese history
Sephardi Jewish culture in Asia
Sephardi synagogues
Synagogues in Lebanon